East Pennsboro Area High School is a midsized, suburban, public high school that serves East Pennsboro Township, Pennsylvania.  The School is located at 425 West Shady Lane, Enola in Cumberland County, Pennsylvania. It is part of the East Pennsboro Area School District (EPASD). In the 2016–2017 school year, the School's enrollment was reported as 809 pupils in 9th through 12th grades.

East Pennsboro Area High School is served by the Capital Area Intermediate Unit 15 which offers a variety of services, including a completely developed K-12 curriculum that is mapped and aligned with the Pennsylvania Academic Standards (available online), shared services, a group purchasing program and a wide variety of special education and special needs services. High school students may choose to attend Cumberland Perry Area Vocational Technical School for training in the construction and mechanical trades.

Extracurricular activities
East Pennsboro High School provides an extensive co-curricular program.

Clubs and organizations

Student council
Varsity club
Chess Club
Girls Athletic Association
Students Against Destructive Decisions
Yearbook
Newspaper
Art & Literary Magazine
Spanish Club
French Club
EP Media (AV Club)
Quiz Bowl Team
Math Club
Peer Mediators
Marching Band
Chorus
Drama Club
Model United Nations
Environment Club

Notable alumni
Anil Dash, Blogger, Entrepreneur, Technologist
Mickey Shuler, Football Player
Mickey Shuler, Jr., Football Player

References

External links
East Pennsboro Area High School student newspaper
East Pennsboro Area High School "Panther" Marching Band
East Pennsboro Area School District

High schools in Central Pennsylvania
Susquehanna Valley
Schools in Cumberland County, Pennsylvania
Public high schools in Pennsylvania